Ash Wednesday is a 1958 Mexican drama film directed by Roberto Gavaldón. It was entered into the 8th Berlin International Film Festival.

Plot
Victoria (María Félix) was attacked in her youth by a Catholic priest. Years later she is a famous prostitute and hates everything related to the Catholic Church. She falls in love with Dr. Federico Lamadrid (Arturo de Córdova), a hidden priest during the Cristero War.

Cast
 María Félix as Victoria Rivas
 Arturo de Córdova as Dr. Federico Lamadrid
 Víctor Junco as José Antonio
 Rodolfo Landa as El Violador
 Andrea Palma as Rosa, amiga de Victoria
 María Rivas as Silvia
 María Teresa Rivas as Elvira
 David Reynoso as Enrique, coronel
 Carlos Fernández as Carlos
 Enrique García Álvarez as Padre Gonzalez
 Luis Aragón as General cristero
 Consuelo Guerrero de Luna as Mujer del burdel
 Arturo Soto Rangel as Notario
 Cuco Sánchez as Soldado cantante
 Arturo Castro 'Bigotón'  as Borracho

References

External links

1958 films
1950s Spanish-language films
1958 drama films
Mexican black-and-white films
Films directed by Roberto Gavaldón
Films about Catholicism
Mexican drama films
1950s Mexican films